John Dollar (born 1961 in Georgia) is an American artist best known for his contributions to a number of RPG settings during the mid-to-late 90s (TSR properties and White Wolf's Changeling).

Biography
John Dollar's illustrations have appeared in many gaming products, some of which include TSR, Inc.'s Dungeons & Dragons campaign settings Ravenloft, Birthright, Dark Sun, and Planescape and Dragon Magazine and Dungeon Magazine articles, FASA's Earthdawn, West End Games' Star Wars RPG, White Wolf Publishing's Werewolf: The Apocalypse and Changeling: The Dreaming, Larry Elmore's Sovereign Stone, and just recently to Tales of the Emerald Serpent anthology and the Shadowhunter's Codex by Cassandra Claire.

Published works

The following bibliography is a list where John Dollar's art work has appeared.

The Shadowhunter Chronicles, Cassandra Claire
"The Shadowhunter's Codex, A Guide to the World of the Nephilim", September 2013

White Wolf Publishing

World of Darkness
"World of Darkness: Time of Judgement", 2004

Changeling: The Dreaming
"Kithbook: Sluagh", 1997
"Kithbook: Nockers", 1997
"Changeling: The Dreaming", 2nd Edition, 1997

West End Games

Star Wars
"The Jedi Academy", 1996

TSR, Inc.

Dragon Magazine
"Ecology of the Crystal Spider", Dragon Magazine #221, September 1995
"Defilers and Preservers", Dragon Magazine #231, July 1996
"Artifacts of Athas, Powerful relics for the Dark Sun setting", Dragon Magazine #234, October 1996

Dungeon Magazine
"Seeking Bloodsilver", Dungeon Magazine #59, May/June 1996
"The Baron's Eyrie", Dungeon Magazine #58, March/April 1996
"Cloaked in Fear", Dungeon Magazine #57, January/February 1996

Forgotten Realms
"Warriors and Priests of the Realms", 1996

Ravenloft
"Death Unchained", 1996
"Death Ascendant", 1996
"Forged of Darkness", 1996

Birthright
"Player's Secrets of Khourane", 1996
"Havens of the Great Bay", 1996
"Sword and Crown", 1995
"Cities of the Sun", 1995

Dark Sun
"Thri-Kreen of Athas", 1995
"Windriders of the Jagged Cliffs The Wanderer’s Chronicle", 1995
"Beyond the Prism Pentad", 1995
"Dark Sun Campaign Setting, Expanded and Revised", 1995

References

External links

"John Dollar: Dark Sun's Mystery Artist", The Obsidian Shard

1961 births
American speculative fiction artists
Artists from Georgia (U.S. state)
Fantasy artists
Game artists
Living people
Place of birth missing (living people)
Role-playing game artists